YGG (You Get Grime, formerly Young Grime Gods) are a trio of grime MCs. The group consists of founding members Saint P and PK (born Alexander Denzil Bamidale Johnson-Cole), both of whom are from Camden, and later addition Lyrical Strally (born Mluleki David Mvubu), who was born in Ealing and raised in Sunbury-on-Thames. The group have released music through Logan Sama's Keepin' It Grimy label, and are currently signed to Flowdan's label SpentShell. They have received extensive airplay on Rinse FM, BBC Radio 1 and 1Xtra and NTS, and have supported AJ Tracey on tour. In 2017, they appeared at several festivals including Glastonbury, Cambridge's Strawberries and Creem and Bristol's Love Saves the Day. In 2018, they played at Detonate Festival in Nottingham, Helios Festival in Corfu, Pop-Kultur in Germany, and Outlook Festival in Croatia.

Career

2006–2010: Formation as YRS and transformation into YGG
In an interview with Big Zuu on Radar Radio's Joints Show on 27 July 2016, PK explained how the group originated as a five-member crew in 2006, until several members dropped out. He and Saint met Lyrical Strally years later through Novelist at a cypher. PK and Lyrical Strally met again by a chance encounter in a nightclub queue, and discovered that they were both attending Kingston University (studying Music Performance and Criminology & Sociology respectively). Strally was invited to join the group as their third member.

From youth centre days... I've known Saint from primary school first of all... From there, first got into spitting and that... Originally, it was a crew called YRS. Young Rebel Soldiers... Saint wasn't there when we made that decision, so Saint come back and he was like "ras, I wanna call it YGG". Originally, there was like five members of it still... I'm not gonna tell you their names... They're my bredrins, innit... From there, obviously certain man took it seriously and that, and certain man fell off and that... We met Strally through Nov... One time I was on this uni ting... I was going there now and I seen L Esser, I was like "what?" In the rave, in the queue, I was like "what you doing here, fam?" He was like "man goes uni here!" I said "what? Link up!" Bam. I swear down, we didn't even go to no classes after that, fam, just chilling up in the park, blazing loudies... I was already going radio with Saint... and then from there... I said "yo, Strally boy, come to our side, please?" And that was it, YGG.

2010–2015: Career beginnings
Strally's first performance on live radio was on pirate station Empire. PK and Saint have recorded music together since 2010, originally operating in a studio in Kilburn. Songs dating back to 2011 are available on PK's SoundCloud account, including "Shut Your Mouth", "Live", "Radio", "We Spit Greeze" and "Worth the Wait". In 2015, they appeared on West London MC AJ Tracey's breakthrough project The Front, on the track "Red Bull".

2015–present: Breakthrough and World Domination
The group's debut single, "Okay", was self-released on 19 September 2015, and premiered via FACT. Joseph 'JP' Patterson, senior editor of Complex UK, wrote of the song: "It's a bouncy number... somewhat jovial... there's now plenty of room for a group like this in the market." Reviewing the song for The Quietus, Tomas Fraser observed "how different their individual styles are; Lyrical Strally, quick-witted with clear, solid diction; Saint, skippy and fast-paced (if a little erratic at times) and PK, a loud, confident, reload-friendly MC with a reputation for turning raves upside down already under his belt." YGG's second single, "Don't Talk Like That" was self-released on 5 January 2016. The song was premiered by i-D, and a remix featuring guest vocals from Spitz, Mic Ty, Big Zuu, Jay Amo and AJ Tracey was released in June of the same year.

In 2017, the group signed to BBC and Rinse FM DJ Logan Sama's record label, Keepin' It Grimy. They released a standalone single entitled "Bad" on 31 March, which was hailed by Pigeons and Planes as an "instant underground anthem". The trio released their debut extended play, World Domination, on 28 November 2017 through Keepin' It Grimy. The project features six group tracks as well as a solo track from each artist, and was preceded by the single "Three IC3s" and the promotional single "Lyca".

In 2018, the group signed to Flowdan's record label and management company, SpentShell. PK released his four-track debut solo EP, The Bad Ombré, with the label on 2 February 2018. In an interview with Notion, the other two group members revealed that they too have been working on solo content: Lyrical Strally has a forthcoming song entitled "I Finesse", while Saint mentioned a song entitled "On To". On 27 April 2018, they released the standalone single "Strikers" through Astral Black, featuring production from Jon Phonics and Impey.

Members
Current
 Saint P – vocals (2006–present)
 PK – vocals (2006–present)
 Lyrical Strally – vocals (2014–present)
 Travis-T – DJ (2016–present)

Discography

Extended plays

Singles

Promotional singles

Other appearances

Remixes

References

English electronic music groups
Musical groups from London
Grime music groups
English hip hop groups